Election of the President of the Senate of the Czech Republic was held on 15 December 2004. Přemysl Sobotka defeated Josef Jařab and became the new President of the Senate. The incumbent President Petr Pithart didn't run.

Background and voting 
After 2004 Senate election the Civic Democratic Party became the largest Senate party. It had 35 seats of 81. Petr Pithart who was a member of Christian and Democratic Union – Czechoslovak People's Party decided to not seek reelection. Civic Democrats nominated Přemysl Sobotka. Caucus for Open Democracy decided to nominate Josef Jařab for the position.

The election was held on 15 December 2004. Sobotka received 55 votes while Jařab only 22. Sobotka stated he wants to help the image of Senate as the new President. Jařab stated he believes that Sobotka will be a good President of Senate. It is believed Sobotka was supported by 35 Civic Democrats and also by some Social Democrats and Christian Democrats.

Result

References

President of the Senate election
1996
Czech Republic, President of the Senate of the  election